Gedge is a surname, and may refer to:

 David Gedge (born 1960), English musician
 David Patrick Gedge (born 1939), British organist 
 Edward Gedge (1895–1991), British modern pentathlete
 Henry Gedge, Scottish rugby union player
 Pauline Gedge (born 1945), Canadian novelist
 Peter Gedge (1910–1993), Scottish rugby union player 
 Sydney Gedge (1829–1923), British politician